Mark Blackburn is an Australian former rugby league footballer who played in the 1980s and 1990s.

Mark Blackburn played with the St. George Dragons during the mid 1980s, and was a first grader for three seasons between 1987-1990. He was a reserve for the Dragons team that won the 1988 Panasonic Cup. Blackburn finished his rugby league career at the South Sydney Rabbitohs at the conclusion of 1990 after joining them mid year.

References

Living people
South Sydney Rabbitohs players
Australian rugby league players
Rugby league players from New South Wales
Rugby league props
Rugby league second-rows
Year of birth missing (living people)
Place of birth missing (living people)
St. George Dragons players